Frederick John Osterling (October 4, 1865, Duquesne, Pennsylvania – July 5, 1934, Pittsburgh, Pennsylvania) was an American architect, practicing in  Pittsburgh from 1888. 

Frederick J. Osterling was born to Philip and Bertha Osterling in Dravosburg, Pennsylvania, in 1865. The Osterling family moved to Allegheny City when Frederick was young. Following his schooling in Allegheny City, Osterling began work in the office of Joseph Stillburg, and was published in American Architect and Building News at age 18. Following a period of European travel, he launched his own practice in 1888. During his career he designed many prominent Pittsburgh buildings, such as the Union Trust Building (1915–17). According to Martin Aurand, Architecture Librarian at Carnegie Mellon University in Pittsburgh, Osterling's practice faltered after controversy relating to his anticipated alteration to the landmark H.H. Richardson Allegheny County Courthouse and a public lawsuit filed by the industrialist Henry Clay Frick. 
Osterling's studio was in a building he designed himself in 1917 at 228 Isabella Street in Pittsburgh's North Shore neighborhood.

Some of Osterling’s works are pictured in a book entitled ," F. J. Osterling Architect" ,  Murdoch-Kerr Press, Pittsburg, 1904. The book contains about 40 plates (some lithos, some artists drawings) depicting Osterling’s works. These plates include views of the Washington County, Pennsylvania Court House, its portico and law library; the entrance and smoking room of the Syria Temple (Pittsburgh); and the residences H.H. Westinghouse and other notable Western Pennsylvanians.

Significant buildings designed by Osterling in chronological order

All buildings are in Pittsburgh unless otherwise stated; italics denote a registered Historic Landmark:

 Charles Schwab House (541 Jones Avenue, North Braddock), 1889
 Heinz Company Factories, 1889
 Bellefield Presbyterian Church (Bellefield and 5th Ave) 1889;  only the bell tower remains),
 Westinghouse Air Brake Company General Office Building (Wilmerding, Pennsylvania), 1889–1890
 Bell Telephone of Pennsylvania Building, now Verizon Building (416-420 Seventh Avenue), 1890
 Marine Bank Building, later known as Fort Pitt Federal Building (301 Smithfield Street), 1890
 Times Building (334-336 Fourth Avenue), 1892
 Byrnes & Kiefer Building(1133 Penn Avenue), 1892
 Clayton, now the Frick Art & Historical Center, 1892 remodeling by Osterling of an 1870s house at 7200 Penn Avenue. This was the home of Henry Clay Frick, the industrialist.
 First Methodist Church, now Shadyside Seventh Day Adventist Church (821 South Aiken Avenue), 1893
 Chautauqua Lake Ice Company Warehouse, now the Heinz History Center (1212 Smallman Street), 1898
 Washington County Courthouse & Jail (Washington, Pennsylvania), 1899–1900
 Allegheny County Morgue (Originally on Forbes Avenue; the building was physically moved to 542 Fourth Avenue in 1929), built 1901

 Armstrong Cork Company Building, now The Cork Factory Lofts (2349 Railroad Street at 23rd Street), 1901
 Basilica of St. Michael the Archangel in Loretto, Pennsylvania, 1901
Hays Hall, a residence hall at Washington & Jefferson College in Washington, Pennsylvania, built from 1901 to 1903 (demolished in 1994)
Washington Trust Building, Washington, Pennsylvania, 1902
 Arrott Building (401 Wood Street), 1902
 Colonial Trust Company Building, now part of the Bank Center of Point Park University (Wood Street, between Forbes and Fourth Avenues), 1902. Also, Osterling designed a T-shaped lobby that was added to his original building in 1926.

 Carnegie Free Library of Beaver Falls (Beaver Falls, Pennsylvania), 1903
 Iroquois Apartments, now offices (3600 Forbes Avenue), 1903
 Allegheny County Jail (Ross Street), 1903-1905 additions by Osterling to the 1886 building by Henry Hobson Richardson
 Allegheny High School, now Allegheny Middle School (810 Arch Street), 1904
 Commonwealth Trust Building (312 Fourth Avenue), 1907
 Luzerne County Courthouse (Wilkes-Barre, Pennsylvania), 1909
 Parkvale Building (200 Meyran Ave), 1911
 Union Trust Building (501 Grant Street), 1917
 Gwinner-Harter House, also known as the William B. Negley House (5061 Fifth Avenue) was designed by an unknown architect and built 1870-1871. However, Osterling was responsible for additions between 1912 and 1923.
 Osterling Flats, date unavailable. These are three houses at 3603-3607 California Avenue with Dutch design elements, which were converted into condos by the Brighton Heights Citizens' Federation in 2003.

Gallery

Notes

External links
Structures by Osterling

References
J. Franklin Nelson, comp. Works of F. J. Osterling, Architect, Pittsburg.  Pittsburgh:  Murdoch-Kerr Press, 1904.
Franklin Toker, Buildings of Pittsburgh, Charlottesville, Virginia: University of Virginia Press, 2007, .
Franklin Toker, Pittsburgh: An Urban Portrait, Pittsburgh: University of Pittsburgh Press, 1995, ..
James D. Van Trump & Arthur P. Ziegler, Jr., Landmark Architecture of Allegheny County Pennsylvania, Pittsburgh: Pittsburgh History & Landmarks Foundation, 1967, No ISBN.

1865 births
1934 deaths
People from Duquesne, Pennsylvania
19th-century American architects
Architects from Pittsburgh
Frederick J. Osterling buildings
20th-century American architects